N94 may refer to:
 N94 (Long Island bus)
 Carlisle Airport (Pennsylvania), in Cumberland County, Pennsylvania, United States
 Escadrille N.94, a unit of the French Air Force
 , a submarine of the Royal Navy
 Nebraska Highway 94, in the United States
 Scania N94, a city bus